Quarlton was a township of the civil and ecclesiastical parish of Bolton le Moors in the Hundred of Salford, Lancashire, England.

Toponymy
Quarlton is derived from the Old English  and  meaning the mill hill. A  was a millstone. Quarlton was recorded as Quernedon in 1301, Querndone in 1302; Quordone in 1309 and Quarndon or Quarnton were frequently used until modern times.

Manor
The manor originated as two oxgangs of land in Edgworth which the Radcliffes kept on granting the main portion to the Traffords. Ellis de Quarlton contributed to the subsidy in 1332. Quarlton was held by the Radcliffes of Smithills Hall, and the Bartons, and was sold in 1723 by Lord Fauconberg. The Knights Hospitaller held land in Quarlton from early times, the land was occupied by the Smithills family. Mrs Julia Wright of Macclesfield inherited the manor from her father the Rev. Henry Wright.

Quarlton was a sparsely populated hamlet with few houses. In 1666 no houses had more than two hearths liable to the hearth tax, and the total number of hearths was 21. By the mid 19th century the population was employed in collieries and the Quarlton Vale calico print-works which were established early in the century.

Governance
Quarlton ceased to exist when it was incorporated into the village of Edgworth in 1898, within the Urban District of Turton

Geography
Quarlton was a boundary township to the north east of the ancient ecclesiastical parish of Bolton le Moors

Demography

References
Notes

Bibliography

History of the Metropolitan Borough of Bolton
Geography of the Metropolitan Borough of Bolton
Geography of Blackburn with Darwen
West Pennine Moors